Acta Oncologica is a peer-reviewed medical journal of oncology and the official journal of the five Nordic oncological societies. It is published by Taylor and Francis Group and was established in 1963. The editor-in-chief is Mef Nilbert (Lunds University). According to the Journal Citation Reports, the journal has a 2021 impact factor of 4.311.

References

External links 
 

Oncology journals
English-language journals
Taylor & Francis academic journals
Publications established in 1963
8 times per year journals